Durio lanceolatus is a tree in the family Malvaceae.

Distribution and habitat
Durio lanceolatus is endemic to Borneo.

Uses
Durio lanceolatus is a source of durian timber, used in construction and furniture. The fruit of this species is not considered edible.

Conservation
Durio lanceolatus has been assessed as near threatened on the IUCN Red List. The species is threatened by logging for its timber and conversion of forests for agricultural uses. Such conversions have increased the risk of fires. Mining is a threat in Kalimantan. Durio lanceolatus is found in protected areas including Gunung Mulu National Park and Gunung Gading National Park.

References

lanceolatus
Endemic flora of Borneo
Plants described in 1875